Monte Catequilla (also Kati-Killa) is an archaeological site in the Pomasqui Valley of Ecuador. Attributed to the Pre-Columbian era Quitu-Cara culture, it was presumably used as an astronomical observatory even before the arrival of the Incas, and is the only prehispanic site in the Americas that is located precisely at the Earth's Equator.

History
Catequilla is translated from Quechua to mean "follower of the moon". Its construction, circa 800 AD, is attributed to the Quitu-Cara culture. It leans toward the east end south sides with at an azimuth of 113 degrees, and declines on the western end to the north side, with an azimuth of 293 degrees. In the northwest of the site, there is a lithic disk (a circular stone-filled platform)  in diameter, consisting mainly of stone masonry. It has three lines of stones. Situated on a hill, there was a water source at the site at one time.

Along with the stone-filled circles of Jarata and Pacpo to the south, it forms a straight line along which the shade from the mountains falls during the June solstice. While many of the indigenous people today believe that the purpose of these circles was to provide a solid flat surface for the threshing of wheat and other cereals, several astronomic and geodetic alignments have been detected, questioning the validity of this theory. After several archaeological excavations by Oswaldo Tovar, many ceramics were unearthed from Incan and colonial times. Though the site is virtually abandoned, nearby mining operations in the area could jeopardize its integrity. Even so, the government has taken no action. As it is located on the equator, it is said to be in the "Middle of the World". As of 2011, it is said to be "the only important pre-Inca site in Ecuador to have been commercially exploited."

References

Archaeological sites in Ecuador
Ancient astronomical observatories
Buildings and structures in Pichincha Province
Equator monuments